Wu Lin (born 1909) was a Chinese politician. She was one of the first group of women elected to the Legislative Yuan in 1948.

Biography
Originally from Huili County, Wu became a member of the Second Provisional Senate of Xikang Province in 1943.

She was a candidate in Xikang in the 1948 parliamentary elections and was elected to the Legislative Yuan, while her husband Ma Yuquan was a substitute member. In the first session of the Legislative Yuan she joined the Border Affairs Committee, the Political and Local Autonomy Committee and the Education and Culture Committee.

References

1909 births
20th-century Chinese women politicians
Members of the 1st Legislative Yuan
Year of death missing